Hord is a surname. Notable people with the surname include:

Brian Hord (1934–2015), British surveyor and politician
Chad Hord (born 1976), American racing driver
Donal Hord (1902–1966), American sculptor
Oscar B. Hord (1829–1888), American politician and lawyer
Roy Hord Jr. (1934–2002), American football player

See also
Horde (disambiguation)
Hoard (disambiguation)